Ilisaine Karen David (born 17 December 1977) is a Brazilian former basketball player who competed in the 2000 Summer Olympics.

References

1977 births
Living people
Brazilian women's basketball players
Olympic basketball players of Brazil
Basketball players at the 2000 Summer Olympics
Olympic bronze medalists for Brazil
Olympic medalists in basketball
Medalists at the 2000 Summer Olympics